Panchayat College  located in Bargarh, Odisha, India was inaugurated on 5 July 1960 by Utkal Kesari Dr. Hare Krushna Mahatab, the then chief minister of Odisha. Panchayat College comes under the jurisdiction of Sambalpur University. There are streams like arts, commerce and science. B.Ed. and IGNOU courses are also available.

Facilities
Hostel for both boys and girls, wifi, security cameras, college library with a huge collection of books, a field, cold water supply, botanical garden, conference hall, department for subjects, laboratories, examination section room, SAMS lab.

Activities
Annual college sports, NCC, NSS activities, annual function, Swachh Bharat mission, annual college magazine programme, awareness programmes, laptop distribution.

References

Department of Higher Education, Odisha
Universities and colleges in Odisha
Bargarh district
Educational institutions established in 1960
1960 establishments in Orissa